Nakap Nalo is a Bharatiya Janata Party politician from Arunachal Pradesh. He has been elected in Arunachal Pradesh Legislative Assembly election in 2019 from Nacho constituency as candidate of Bharatiya Janata Party. He is the minister of Tourism and Transport & Civil Aviation departments in Second Pema Khandu ministry from 2019.

References 

Living people
Bharatiya Janata Party politicians from Arunachal Pradesh
Arunachal Pradesh MLAs 2019–2024
Year of birth missing (living people)
People from Upper Subansiri district